Khrystyna Kots-Hotlib; (born 2 May 1983 in Donetsk, Ukraine) is a Ukrainian singer and beauty pageant titleholder who was crowned Miss Ukraine Universe 2009 and represented Ukraine in Miss Universe 2009 and was a member of the pop Ukrainian girl trio VIA-Gra (ВИА Гра).

Biography
Since childhood, she was involved in dance and rhythmic gymnastics and became a master of sports. When Khrystyna was 15 years old, she won the city's beauty and talent contest. As a student of economics, Khrystyna began to participate in beauty contests, where she won numerous titles. Among them: "Miss Donbass-2003", nomination "Miss Donetsk"; "Miss Donbass 2004", nomination "Vice-Miss Decade"; "Miss international Black Sea 2003". A modeling career developed just as rapidly. Christina participated in the fashion festival "Moda-Lux-2004" at "Donbass Palace", worked in the defile of the boutiques "Pani & Fashion", "Mexx", in the defile of Diana Dorozhkina. She graduated from DonNUET with honors, completed the master of sports program in rhythmic gymnastics, received an excellent master's degree in international economics. After graduation, she began to actively learning how to sing, choreography, and took acting lessons.

Nu Virgos
In February 2006 the group starts filming their new video for the "Обмани, Но Останься" (Cheat, But Stay) song with Khrystyna. Khrystyna's first performance as a member of the group took place in Kyiv on March 24 at the Oasis Club. The renewed line-up of the band took part in a photo shoot for the May issue of the men's magazine "XXL". In April 2006, Khrystyna leaves the group.

References

External links
The official Miss Universe website
Official Website

1983 births
Living people
Musicians from Donetsk
Miss Universe 2009 contestants
Ukrainian female models
Nu Virgos members
Ukrainian beauty pageant winners
Ukrainian pop musicians